In computer science, the semantic desktop is a collective term for ideas related to changing a computer's user interface and data handling capabilities so that data are more easily shared between different applications or tasks and so that data that once could not be automatically processed by a computer could be. It also encompasses some ideas about being able to share information automatically between different people. This concept is very much related to the Semantic Web, but is distinct insofar as its main concern is the personal use of information.

General description
The vision of the semantic desktop can be considered as a response to the perceived problems of existing user interfaces. Without good metadata, computers cannot easily learn many commonly needed attributes about files. For example, suppose one downloads a document by a particular author on a particular subject - though the document will likely clearly indicate its subject, author, source and possibly copyright information there may be no easy way for the computer to obtain this information and process it across applications like file managers, desktop search engines, and other services. This means the computer cannot search, filter or otherwise act upon the information as effectively as it otherwise could. This is very much the problem that the Semantic Web is concerned with.

Secondly there is the problem of relating different files with each other. For example, on operating systems such as Unix, e-mails are stored separately from files.  Neither has anything to do with tasks, notes or planned activities that may be stored in a calendar program. Contacts might be stored in another program. However, all these forms of information might simultaneously be relevant and necessary for a particular task.

Related to this, a user will often access a lot of data from the Internet which are segregated from the data stored locally on the computer and accessed through a browser or other program. As well as accessing data, a user has to share data, often through e-mail or separate file transfer programs.

The semantic desktop is an attempt to solve some or all of these problem by extending the operating system's capabilities to handle all data using Semantic Web technologies. Based on this data integration, improved user interfaces (or plugins to existing applications) can give the user an integrated view on stored knowledge.
Some operating systems such as BeOS have database filesystems which store metadata about a document natively in the filesystem, which is a move towards a more semantic desktop.

A definition of Semantic Desktop was given (Sauermann et al. 2005):
A Semantic Desktop is a device in which an individual stores all her digital information like documents, multimedia and messages. These are interpreted as 
Semantic Web resources, each is identified by a Uniform Resource Identifier (URI) and 
all data is accessible and queryable as Resource Description Framework (RDF) graph. Resources from the web can be 
stored and authored content can be shared with others. Ontologies allow the user to express personal mental models and form the semantic glue interconnecting information 
and systems. Applications respect this and store, read and communicate via ontologies 
and Semantic Web protocols. The Semantic Desktop is an enlarged supplement to the 
user’s memory.

Different interpretations of the semantic desktop
There are various interpretations of the semantic desktop. At its most limited state it might be interpreted as adding mechanisms for relating machine readable metadata to files. In a more extreme way it could be viewed  as a complete replacement to existing user interfaces, which unifies all forms of data and provides a consistent single interface. There are many degrees between these two depending on which of the above problems are being dealt with.

Standardization effort
To foster interoperability between different implementations and publish standards, the community around the Nepomuk project founded the OSCA Foundation (OSCAF) in 2008. Since June 2009, the developers from the Nepomuk-KDE communities and Xesam collaborate with OSCAF to help standardizing the data formats for KDE, GNOME and freedesktop.org. The Nepomuk/OSCAF standards are taken up by these projects and Nokia's Maemo Platform.

Relationship with the Semantic Web
The Semantic Web is mainly concerned with making machine readable metadata to enable computers to process shared information, and the creation of formats and standards related to this. As such the aims of allowing more of a user's data to be processed by a computer and allowing data to more easily be shared could be considered as a subset of those of the Semantic Web, but extended to a user's local computer, rather than just files stored on the Internet.

However the aims of creating a unified interface and allowing data to be accessed in a format independent way are not really the concerns of the Semantic Web.

In practice most projects related to the semantic desktop make use of Semantic Web protocols for storing their data. In particular RDF's concepts are used, and the format itself is used.

See also
Semantic Web
Be File System (BFS), the metadata driven filesystem of BeOS that provided attribute queries, metadata editing and dynamic folders integrated into the desktop as part of Tracker, the file manager.
Chandler, a personal information manager
Concept maps
Desktop search
Dublin Core, a set of general terms for annotating web resources with metadata
Haystack, an information client developed at MIT
Knowledge Management
Mind maps
NEPOMUK, a specification for a social semantic desktop framework
Personal Information Manager
Tabbles, a desktop tagging tool for files, emails and bookmarks
WinFS, a data storage and management system based on relational databases, developed by Microsoft
Zeitgeist (framework)

References

 Stefan Decker, Martin Frank: The Social Semantic Desktop. DERI Technology Report, 2004.
 Stefan Decker, Martin Frank: The Networked Semantic Desktop. WWW Workshop on Application Design, Development and Implementation Issues in the Semantic Web 2004.
 Leo Sauermann, Ansgar Bernardi, Andreas Dengel:Overview and Outlook on the Semantic Desktop. In Proceedings of the 1st Workshop on The Semantic Desktop at the ISWC 2005 Conference.

External links

Semiodesk Organiser, a semantic desktop for Windows based on NEPOMUK ontologies, Semantic Web technologies and .NET

Open Source Implementations
Semantic Desktop with KDE, NEPOMUK-based social semantic desktop is integrated into KDE Plasma Workspaces
Zeitgeist, based on NEPOMUK and used in GNOME and the Ubuntu Unity user interface
Gnowsis, an early reference implementation of NEPOMUK
NEPOMUK Java the Java implementation of NEPOMUK, done in parallel to the KDE one, gnowsis was discontinued by the developers to work on this
Deepamehta, a software platform for knowledge management
Tracker, a metadata database and file search
Iris, a semantic desktop application framework

 
Information systems